The Suhum constituency is in the Eastern region of Ghana. The current member of Parliament for the constituency is Kwadjo Asante. He was elected  on the ticket of the New Patriotic Party (NPP) and  won a majority of 
34,049 votes representing 64.0% more than candidate closest in the race, to win the constituency election to become the MP.

See also
List of Ghana Parliament constituencies

References

Parliamentary constituencies in the Eastern Region (Ghana)